Robert Scott Paulin (born February 13, 1950) is an American actor and director. He is perhaps best known for playing Deke Slayton in the film The Right Stuff (1983). He has also acted in films including Cat People (1982), Teen Wolf (1985), The Accused (1988), Turner & Hooch (1989), and I Am Sam (2001). He also portrayed Red Skull in Captain America (1990).

Early life and education
Born and raised in Steubenville, Ohio, Paulin attended Steubenville High School. He earned a Bachelor of Arts degree in political science from Pomona College in 1971.

Career
Paulin first guest starred on several television series during the late-1970s and early-1980s, including two episodes of St. Elsewhere in 1981. He gained notice appearing in the television film Vampire. He got his big break in 1983, with a supporting role in the widely acclaimed space film The Right Stuff, for which he played astronaut Deke Slayton. Later on, he appeared in other films those include Teen Wolf  (1985), The Accused  (1988), Turner and Hooch  (1989), Pump Up the Volume  (1990) and I Am Sam (2001). He also voiced Jasper T. Jowls from Chuck E. Cheese from 1977 to 1985. He has since appeared in over 100 credits.

Personal life 
Since 1981, Paulin has been married to Wendy Phillips. The couple has one child, a daughter.

Filmography

Film

Television

References

External links

1950 births
American male film actors
American male television actors
Living people
Ohio State University College of Arts and Sciences alumni
People from Steubenville, Ohio
Pomona College alumni